Giulești may refer to several places in Romania:

Giulești, a neighborhood of Bucharest
Giulești, a commune in Maramureș County
Giulești, a village in Pietroasa Commune, Bihor County
Giulești, a village in Secuieni Commune, Neamț County
Giulești, a village in Boroaia Commune, Suceava County
Giulești and Giuleștii de Sus, villages in Fârtățești Commune, Vâlcea County